Diplodactylus klugei is a species of gecko, a lizard in the family Gekkonidae. The species is endemic to Australia.

Etymology
The specific name, klugei, is in honor of American herpetologist Arnold G. Kluge.

Geographic range
D. klugei is found in the Australian state of Western Australia.

Reproduction
D. klugei is oviparous.

References

Further reading
Aplin KP, Adams M (1998). "Morphological and genetic discrimination of new species and subspecies of gekkonid and scincid lizards (Squamata: Lacertilia) from the Carnarvon Basin region of Western Australia". Journal of the Royal Society of Western Australia 81: 201–223. (Diplodactylus klugei, new species).
Cogger HG (2014). Reptiles and Amphibians of Australia, Seventh Edition. Clayton, Victoria, Australia: CSIRO Publishing. xxx + 1,033 pp. .
Wilson, Steve; Swan, Gerry (2013). A Complete Guide to Reptiles of Australia, Fourth Edition. Sydney: New Holland Publishers. 522 pp. .

Diplodactylus
Geckos of Australia
Reptiles described in 1998
Taxa named by Kenneth Peter Aplin
Reptiles of Western Australia